Oghma may refer to:

 Ogma, champion of the Tuatha Dé Danann in Irish mythology
 Oghma (Forgotten Realms), interpretation of the mythological Ogma by the game Dungeons and Dragons
 Oghma (magazine), defunct Irish-language literary journal